Huanggang River is a river in Guangdong (黄冈镇碧洲村石黾头) and Fujian China.

References

Rivers of China